The Swiss Guide and Scout Movement (SGSM) (German: Pfadibewegung Schweiz (PBS), French: Mouvement Scout de Suisse (MSdS), Italian: Movimento Scout Svizzero (MSS), Rumantsch: Moviment Battasendas Svizra (MBS)) is the national Scouting and Guiding association of Switzerland formed in 1987. The SGSM has more than 50,500 members in about 550 local groups (as of 2022).

The Swiss Guide and Scout Movement is mixed at all levels. The only thing that still reminds of the old separation between Girl Guides and Boy Scouts is that some of the terms for different levels (in one or more of the three major languages spoken in Switzerland) are different. 

The young age of Swiss leaders is a tradition, "the young lead the young". Even members of the district or national committees are rarely older than 30. The result is more freedom at the unit level, no discrimination, and a very important experience in leadership for young people.

The mandatory parts of the Swiss uniform are the shirt, the neckerchief, any kind of good hiking boots, a fire lighter and a Swiss army knife. Optional parts are belt, Scout jeans, hat, dagger, etc. A youth receives his/her neckerchief and vulgo (Scout name) from his unit leader in an initiation ceremony.

History 

In 1910, the first Scout group in Switzerland was founded in Basel as part of the abstinence movement. :fr:Gaston Clerc, then secretary-general of the Unions Cadettes de suisse romande, enthusiastically supported the Scout method after reading Scouting for Boys. He organized several conferences (notably in Le Locle in October 1910) within the cadet unions to explain and discuss the interest of cadets in using the Scout method. In 1911, the first groups of Swiss Girl Guides were formed. Gaston Clerc bought the translations of Scouting for Boys and translated the first chapter for those who would become Scouts. In 1912, delegates of the cadet sections of the Union chrétienne de la suisse romande launched the Swiss Scout movement. William Borel chaired this neutral committee to patronize and spread Scouting in Switzerland. Geneva pedagogue Pierre Bovet took up the translation of Éclaireurs and other Scout books, to make it the first edition in French. This edition was the first in a long series of Scout books published by the publishing house :fr:Delachaux et Niestlé in Neuchâtel. In 1913, the Federation of Swiss Scouts (Fédération des Eclaireurs suisses, FES/Schweizerische Pfadfinderbund (SPB)) was founded in Bern. This brought together the multilingual Swiss Scouts under the same organization.  In 1919, the Swiss Federation of Girl Guides (Fédération des Eclaireuses suisse, (FESes)/Bund Schweizerischer Pfadfinderinnen (BSP)) was established.

Switzerland was among the charter members of the World Organization of the Scout Movement in 1922 and among the founding members of the World Association of Girl Guides and Girl Scouts in 1928.  In 1925, the first Federal Camp was held. 

In 1931, the first World Scout Moot was held at Kandersteg International Scout Centre. In 1939, after the beginning of World War II, Swiss Scouts also began to support the Swiss army. Many Scouts were registered with the International Red Cross.

In 1953, a second World Scout Moot took place In Kandersteg. In 1957, WAGGGS organized a World Camp at the Lac de Conche.

In 1980, the first Federal Camp of FES and FESes in common took place in the region of Gruyères. The originally separate Swiss Guide Federation and Swiss Scout Federation merged in 1987. 

In 1992, the World Scout Moot took place in Kandersteg for the third time.

In 2003, The SGSM was reformed. After structural changes, the SGSM is now run by the Swiss federal government :de:Jugend und Sport ("Youth and Sports"), a governmental institution affiliated with the Federal Department of Defence, Civil Protection and Sports, which promotes sports among youth. Camps for youth in the 5-20 age range are subsidized by J+S, and also receive some basic material (wool blankets, denim square units, ropes, spades, etc.) from J+S for these occasions. J+S is also deeply involved in leader training, because unit leaders are basically special youth sport trainers.

Program

Sections
The association is divided in five sections according to age. The different languages-Swiss German, French, and Italian-use different terms for sections:
 Beaver Scouts: Biber , Castors , Castori  - ages 5 to 6
 Brownies and Cubs: Wölfli , Louveteaux , Lupetti  - ages 7 to 9/10
 Guides and Scouts: Pfadi , Éclaireurs , Esploratrici/Esploratori  - ages 10/11 to 13/14
 Ventures: Pio , Pico , Pionieri  - ages 14/15 to 16
 Rovers: Rover , Routiers , Rover  - ages 17 and older

Special Scout units include Sea Scouts around the major lakes and Extension Scouting for handicapped young people.

Scout Motto
There are different mottoes for each section:

 Beaver Scouts: 
 Brownies and Cubs: My Best translates as Mis Bescht in Swiss German and De notre mieux ("of our best") in French
 Guides and Scouts: Always Prepared translates as Allzeit bereit in German, Toujours prêt in French and Sempre pronto in Italian
 Ventures: Together Further translates as Zäme Wiiter in Swiss German
 Rovers: Act Consciously translates as Bewusst Handeln in German

Scout Promise
(With the help of God,) with your help and happily I promise to do my best:
 To study in details the values of our Scout Law
 To search for the meaning of my life
 To be involved in the community where I live.

Scout Law
Guides and Scouts, we wish:
 To be honest and sincere
 To listen to and respect others
 To rejoice in all that is beautiful and give joy to others
 To be thoughtful and helpful
 To share
 To choose to the best of our abilities and to commit ourselves
 To protect nature and respect life
 To face difficulties with confidence

BuLa Jamborees
The Bundeslager (BuLa) (fr:"camp fédéral", it:"campo federale", "rm:"champ federal") "Federal camp" is a scout jamboree that is held by the association every 14 years.

Bula occurrences
(hosts in parenthesis)

 1925 in Bern (SPB)
 1932 in Geneva (SPB)
 1938 in Zürich (SPB)
 1948 in Trevano, Lugano (SPB)
 1949 in Gotthard (BSP), first girlscout BuLa
 1956 in Saignelégier (SPB)
 1957 in Goms (Bund Schweizerischer Pfadfinderinnen)
 1966 in Domleschg (SPB
 1969 in Bleniotal  (Bund Schweizerischer Pfadfinderinnen)
 1980 in Gruyère (SPB and BSP)
 1994 in Napf Motto «Cuntrast» (SGSM)
 2008 in Linth valley Motto «Contura» (SGSM)
 2022 in GomsMotto «mova» (SGSM)

See also
 Kandersteg International Scout Centre
 Walter von Bonstetten
 Pfadi Winterthur
 Our Chalet
 Luc Panissod
 Maurice Machenbaum

References

External links 
 Official Homepage
Site about the history of Scouting in the canton of Vaud 
 Site about the history of Scouting in Switzerland 

World Association of Girl Guides and Girl Scouts member organizations
World Organization of the Scout Movement member organizations
Scouting and Guiding in Switzerland

Youth organizations established in 1912
1912 establishments in Switzerland